Mamiko Higa (born 11 October 1993) is a Japanese professional golfer.

Amateur career
Higa represented Japan at the 2010 Asian Games. She finished 8th in the individual competition and 4th in the team competition.

Professional career
Higa plays on the LPGA of Japan Tour where she has five wins. She has twice finished in the top-10 at the Women's British Open – T7 in 2013 and T4 in 2018. In her first U.S. Women's Open appearance, she led after the first round.

Personal life
Higa is in a relationship with professional sumo wrestler Ikioi Shōta.

Professional wins (5)

LPGA of Japan Tour wins (5)

Results in LPGA majors
Results not in chronological order before 2019.

CUT = missed the half-way cut
NT = no tournament
T = tied

Team appearances
Amateur
Espirito Santo Trophy (representing Japan): 2010

Professional
International Crown (representing Japan): 2014, 2018
The Queens (representing LPGA of Japan Tour): 2017

References

External links

Japanese female golfers
LPGA of Japan Tour golfers
Sportspeople from Okinawa Prefecture
1993 births
Living people
21st-century Japanese women